Manuel Dabreu is an electrical engineer with the SanDisk Corporation in El Dorado Hills, California.

Dabreu was named a Fellow of the Institute of Electrical and Electronics Engineers (IEEE) in 2014 for his contributions to the design of resilient manufacturing processes for electronic products.

References 

Fellow Members of the IEEE
Living people
Year of birth missing (living people)
Place of birth missing (living people)
American electrical engineers